Geoffrey Howard may refer to:

Geoffrey Howard (British politician) (1877–1935), British Liberal politician
Geoffrey Howard (cricketer) (1909–2002), English cricketer and administrator
Geoff Howard (born 1955), Australian Labor politician
Geoffrey Howard (British Army officer) (1876–1966), British general
Ralph Cosham, pseudonym Geoffrey Howard (1936–2014), book narrator and actor

See also
Jeffrey R. Howard (born 1955), U.S. judge